Max Arias-Schreiber Pezet (January 3, 1923 – March 4, 2004) was a Peruvian lawyer and jurist. He was the Minister of Justice during the Fernando Belaunde presidency.

He was the first of three children of Max Arias Schreiber and his wife, Elvira Pezet Miró-Quesada, granddaughter of the former President Juan Antonio Pezet. He studied at Colegio Sagrados Corazones Recoleta (Lima) and Institut Le Rosey (Switzerland).

People from Lima
1923 births
2004 deaths
National University of San Marcos alumni
Academic staff of the National University of San Marcos
20th-century Peruvian lawyers
Peruvian Ministers of Justice
Alumni of Institut Le Rosey